Spasskaya is the current western terminus station of the Line 4 of the Saint Petersburg Metro. It is part of the first three-way transfer station that also includes Sadovaya and Sennaya Ploshchad stations. The station was originally scheduled to open in December 2008, but eventually opened on March 7, 2009 because of last-minute repairs to station's transfer escalators.

, the station does not have a ground-level vestibule or a connecting escalator. Passengers have to transfer to one of the connected stations in order to exit to the city.

Gallery

See also 
 Saviour Church on Sennaya Square - demolished church from which the station takes its name

External links
 «Спасская» на официальном сайте Петербургского метрополитена
 «Спасская» на metro.vpeterburge.ru
 «Спасская» на ometro.net
 «Спасская» на сайте Проекты Петербурга
 «Спасская» на форуме Metro.NWD.ru

Saint Petersburg Metro stations
Railway stations in Russia opened in 2009
Railway stations located underground in Russia